Håkon Wibe-Lund (born 5 September 1980) is a retired Norwegian football defender and current assistant manager for Odds Ballklubb in Eliteserien.

He hails from Svelvik and started his career in minnows Berger and Svelvik. He attended the Norwegian School of Elite Sport, playing for the school team and Lyn. Without reaching Lyn's first team, he was loaned out to Fossum in the autumn of 2000 before transferring to Asker in 2001.

Ahead of the 2002 season he went on to Kongsvinger, a former first-tier team now on the third tier. He registered 77 league games, but lost the 2004 season to injury. He joined second-tier club Hønefoss BK in 2007, but more injuries led him to retire and instead became player developer. He had already coached Svelvik.

In 2013 he became player developer and assistant coach of Fredrikstad under Lars Bakkerud, taking over as caretaker manager already in June the same year. Both Lars Bakkerud and director of sports Joacim Jonsson were on illness absence, and when Bakkerud still had not returned at the end of the season, Wibe-Lund got the job permanently on a two-year contract.

He resigned from Fredrikstad in May 2015 following six league matches without victory as well as a cup exit, only to become assistant coach of Strømsgodset in August 2015. In the summer 2019, manager Bjørn Petter Ingebretsen abruptly resigned amid health concerns, and Wibe-Lund became caretaking manager. His last outing as caretaker was a third-round cup exit against third-tier IF Fram Larvik on 19 June. He again became caretaker in April 2021, this time together with Bjørn Petter Ingebretsen, following the sacking of Henrik Pedersen.

References

1980 births
Living people
People from Svelvik
Sportspeople from Vestfold og Telemark
Norwegian footballers
Fossum IF players
Asker Fotball players
Kongsvinger IL Toppfotball players
Hønefoss BK players
Norwegian First Division players
Association football defenders
Norwegian football managers
Fredrikstad FK managers
Strømsgodset Toppfotball managers
Odds BK non-playing staff
Eliteserien managers